Calisto occulta is a butterfly of the family Nymphalidae. It is endemic to Cuba, where it is known from a few localities from the middle part of the Nipe-Sagua-Baracoa mountains, from the Monte Iberia plateau north to near Yamanigüey, in north-eastern Cuba. It is probable that it is more widespread in the Nipe-Sagua-Baracoa mountains. The species inhabits the wet sclerophyllous low forests and rainforests up to 700 meters in the Nipe-Sagua-Baracoa mountain range.

The length of the forewings is 17–20 mm for males and 18–21 mm for females.

The larvae feed on various grasses. They eat the entire shell after hatching and feed at night, remaining in the lower parts of grasses during day.

Etymology
The species name is derived from the Latin occultus (meaning hidden, reserved) and refers to the cryptic nature of this species that remained hidden between its sympatric congeners for a long time.

Gallery

References

Calisto (butterfly)
Butterflies of Cuba
Endemic fauna of Cuba
Insects described in 2012